Rupert von Miller (19 February 1879 – 30 December 1951)) was a German architect and sculptor.

Rupert von Miller was born in Munich and was the son of the bronze caster, goldsmith, and sculptor Fritz von Miller. He was also the grandson of the bronze caster Ferdinand von Miller. Miller studied in Munich and Berlin.

He designed the church of the Assumption of the Blessed Virgin Mary (St. Maria Himmelfahrt) in Bad Wiessee. He also made figures for the Reichenbach Bridge and a bronze bust of his father in the family's chapel in St. Benno's Church, Munich.

In 1930 the von Miller bronze foundry received a commission for a monument to Simón Bolívar. Rupert designed the 3.5-metres-high statue, which was set up in the centre of Bogotá.

The Rupert-von-Miller-Platz in Bad Wiessee was named after him. He is buried in the mountain burial ground in Bad Wiessee.

Notes and references 

1879 births
1952 deaths
20th-century German architects
German sculptors
German male sculptors
Architects from Munich
20th-century sculptors